Altjon Kadriaj (born 5 May 2002) is an Albanian footballer who plays as a winger for Flamurtari in the Kategoria e Parë.

Career

Flamurtari
A graduate of the club's youth academy, Kadriaj made his debut in official competition for the club on 18 September 2019, coming on as a 67th-minute substitute for Gersi Diamanti in a 3–2 away defeat to Veleçiku in the Albanian Cup. He made his Albanian Superliga debut later that season, being subbed on and off again in a 1–0 defeat to Skënderbeu in January 2020.

References

External links

2002 births
Living people
Flamurtari Vlorë players
Kategoria Superiore players
Albanian footballers
Sportspeople from Vlorë
Association football forwards